Dylan Ramsey is an American / Canadian actor and film producer, known for his portrayals of dark dramatic and comedically eccentric characters of diverse ethnicity.  Recent major roles include the leading role of Ginger (a male cross-dressing prostitute) in HBO’s Donny & Ginger, guest-starring as the ethereal suicide bomber Saaed Hotary on FX’s Nip/Tuck and the title role of Jack Belmont in Visual Purple.

He also starred in Air Crash Investigation's "Killing Machine" as Bobby "The Killer", and Air Crash Investigation's "Death of the President" episode on the Polish Air Force Crash in 2014.

Ramsey is currently writing and producing two new media series.

Biography 
Ramsey was born in Prague, Czech Republic and raised in Toronto, Ontario, Canada. His father is Egyptian and his mother is a Polish Jew. He currently lives in Los Angeles County, California.

Filmography

Films

Television

Theatre

Awards

References

External links
 
 

20th-century births
Living people
Year of birth missing (living people)
American male film actors
American male television actors
Canadian male film actors
Canadian male television actors
Male actors from Prague